The PNC Center is a 108-meter (354 feet) tall office building located in Cincinnati, Ohio. It is located primarily in the Central Business District and borders Main Street and East Fifth Street. The building's 27 floors are used for office and commercial use. On the southeast corner of Fifth and Main streets is a public plaza.

Built in 1979, this skyscraper was the tallest completed in Cincinnati during the 1970s decade. It initially served as headquarters of Central Trust Bank, which PNC acquired in 1988. With the acquisition, PNC also became the lead tenant of the historic PNC Tower, Central Trust's headquarters before the 1979 building was constructed.

The building's exterior is typical of 1970s architecture. It features a lightly colored exterior wall with tinted rectangular windows. Unusual for architecture of the time, there are a number of setbacks in the building, both horizontally and vertically. The building has no crown or topped area which is also typical of 1970s architecture. The roof is flat.

The building was designed by Skidmore, Owings & Merril.

References

External links
Emporis.com - Building ID 122050

Skyscraper office buildings in Cincinnati
Office buildings completed in 1979
1979 establishments in Ohio